Nuttallina californica, the California spiny chiton, is a species of chiton in the genus Nuttallina.

Description
The valves are black with an intermittent white stripe that runs dorsally. The girdle is granular and is composed of bristles that are a "reddish-brown" color.

Distribution and habitat
N. californica is endemic to the western coast of North America, specifically California and Baja California, hence its specific epithet and common name.

It is intertidal and can be found in rock crevices, nearby barnacles and mussels.

References

Chitons
Molluscs described in 1847
Taxa named by Lovell Augustus Reeve